Michael Humphrey Dickens Whinney (8 July 19303 February 2017) was a Church of England bishop who served in two episcopal posts; he was also a great-great-grandson of Charles Dickens.

He was born in Chelsea, London on 8 July 1930 and educated at Charterhouse School and Pembroke College, Cambridge (he became a Cambridge Master of Arts {MA(Cantab)}); he later gained a Master of Sacred Theology (STM) degree from General Theological Seminary. He was ordained in 1957 after an earlier career as an accountant. His first ministry position was as a curate at Rainham after which he held two posts in Bermondsey, firstly as priest in charge of the Cambridge University Mission Settlement and later as the vicar of St James' with Christ Church. He became the Archdeacon of Southwark before being ordained to the episcopate in 1982 as the Bishop of Aston. After three years he was translated to be the Bishop of Southwell where he remained until 1988. Taking temporary early retirement from Southwell with an injury in early 1988, he returned to Birmingham for a sabbatical year. In February 1989 (aged 59 and long before retirement age), he was invited to become an Assistant Bishop of Birmingham and Canon of the Cathedral. In retirement he continued to serve as an honorary assistant bishop in Birmingham.

He died on 3 February 2017 at the age of 86.

References

1930 births
2017 deaths
People from Chelsea, London
People educated at Charterhouse School
Alumni of Pembroke College, Cambridge
Archdeacons of Southwark
20th-century Church of England bishops
Bishops of Aston
Bishops of Southwell